Copford Green is a hamlet within the civil parish of Copford and the district of Colchester in Essex, England.

The parish church of St Michael's & All Angels, with sections dating back as far as 1130, is adjacent to Copford Green, as is the manorial house of Copford Hall.

References 

Hamlets in Essex
Borough of Colchester